Muthappan Kavu, also known as Muthappan Mala is a village situated in Memunda, 5 km from Vatakara town in Kozhikode district of Kerala state, India.

Tourism
Muthappan Kavu village is a religious attraction as well as a tourist hotspot. The village attracts a lot of tourists from outside of India also and every year there is a festival.

Onam Festival
In 2006 Onaghosham is celebrated in Muthappan Kavu by the government of Kerala, India.

Transportation
Muthakppan Kavu village connects to other parts of India through Vatakara city on the west and Kuttiady town on the east.  National highway No.66 passes through Vatakara and the northern stretch connects to Mangalore, Goa and Mumbai.  The southern stretch connects to Cochin and Trivandrum.  The eastern Highway  going through Kuttiady connects to Mananthavady, Mysore and Bangalore. The nearest airports are at Kannur and Kozhikode.  The nearest railway station is at Vatakara.

References

Villages in Kozhikode district
Vatakara area